Heaton TMD is a railway traction maintenance depot situated in the Heaton area of Newcastle upon Tyne, England, it is located next to the East Coast Main Line, around  east of Newcastle Central station. Heaton was a sub-shed of Gateshead between 1963 and 1967.

History

Unliked by crews due to the need to pass through three tunnels and the resultant toxic smoke in their cabs, in 1905 it was electrified using 750 VDC technology, with power supplied via both overhead catenary and, within the tunnels, third-rail. Both of the BTH/Brush 640 hp (BR Class ES1) locomotives were based at Heaton, designed as a Bo-Bo with central cab. They worked from the shed until 1967.

Coded 52B in the NE Region (Newcastle District) under British Railways, in 1954 it had an allocation of 95 locomotives, comprising:16x 4-6-2; 17x 2-6-2; 1x 4-4-0; 14x 2-6-0 (9 LNE + 5 LMS-type); 14x 0-6-0; 12x 2-6-2T; 1x 0-6-2T; 18x 0-6-0T; and 2x ES1's.

On 22 March 2022 a TransPennine Express Class 802 derailed at Heaton depot and collided with concrete barriers. There were no injuries reported.

Present
After demolition and redevelopment to diesel traction in the 1960s by British Railways, today the depot is operated by Northern, and mostly houses stock operated by them and Grand Central. The depot code is HT.

The basic allocation consists of Class 156 and British Rail Class 158 diesel multiple units operated by Northern. Although not allocated to the depot, Class 180 and Class 800 units, TransPennine Express and London North Eastern Railway storing units and/or contracting out maintenance at this depot.

Northern Class 158s and Class 150s also regularly visit Heaton for maintenance.

Network Rail's New Measurement Train is allocated to Heaton and can be seen stored on site, although not as regular as it used to be. Maintenance on its recording equipment is carried out at the Railway Technical Centre in Derby.

Sewage and clean out
Heaton is used by the main express operator of the East Coast Main Line to store stock overnight. In 2004–06, this led to a dispute between the RMT and then operator GNER. Legally in the UK, train operators are allowed to discharge  of sewage per carriage per journey, onto the railtrack. Most Mk3 carriages have only holding tanks, not fully compliant toilet tanks. Further, Heaton then had no toilet clean-out facilities. However, in the 2000s both the RMT and politicians were concerned at the environmental impact of this legacy issue. In 2006 the RMT agreed waste tank and clean out developments at Heaton with GNER, plus new clean out procedures at all other depots, to solve an ongoing dispute over sewage spray.

Access
The depot is closed to the general public. Only those with an official pass can access the depot, or those attending the occasional open days organised by Northern.

The entrance to the site is from Benfield Road, just south of where the ECML crosses it.

References

Notes

Sources
 

Buildings and structures in Newcastle upon Tyne
Railway depots in England
Transport in Newcastle upon Tyne